Madelynn Gorman-Shore (born January 1, 1999) is an American taekwondo athlete. She won the silver medal at the 2018 World Taekwondo Grand Slam on the women's heavyweight's. As of the December 2018 World Taekwondo rankings, Gorman-Shore is currently ranked 5th in the women's -73 kg. division.

References 

1999 births
Living people
American female taekwondo practitioners
Sportspeople from Denver
Pan American Games medalists in taekwondo
Pan American Games bronze medalists for the United States
Taekwondo practitioners at the 2019 Pan American Games
Pan American Taekwondo Championships medalists
Medalists at the 2019 Pan American Games
21st-century American women